This List of mountains and hills in Saxony-Anhalt shows a selection of high or well-known mountain and hills in the German state of Saxony-Anhalt (in order of height).

Mountains 
Name, Height in metres above sea level, Location (District/Region)

 Brocken, Harz district, Harz 
 Heinrichshöhe (1,044 m), Harz district
 Königsberg (1.023 m), Harz district 
 Kleiner Brocken (1,019 m), Harz district
 Renneckenberg (933 m), Harz district
 Pferdekopf (857 m), Harz district
 Erdbeerkopf (848 m), Harz district
 Kleiner Winterberg (837 m), Harz district
 Großer Jägerkopf (745 m), Harz district
 Wolfsklippen (723 m), Harz district
 Scharfenstein (696 m), Harz district
 Oberer Meineckenberg (644 m), Harz district
 Carlshaushöhe, Harz district

Hills 

 Großer Gierskopf, Harz district
 Schalliete (595 m), Harz district  
 Zwißelkopf (587 m), Harz district
 Ramberg (582 m), Harz district
 Großer Auerberg (580 m), Mansfeld-Südharz district, Harz
 Rauher Jacob (568 m), Harz district
 Ortberg (549 m), Harz district
 Leckenkopf (546 m), Harz district 
 Großer Hornberg (537 m), Harz district 
 Großer Stemberg (517 m), Harz district
 Büchenberg (516 m), Harz district
 Hilmersberg (507 m), Harz district 
 Bockberg (495 m), Harz district 
 Hohe Warte (374 m), Harz district
 Schimmelsberg (324 m), Mansfeld-Südharz district, Harz
 Buchenberg (314 m), Harz district, Huy 
 Orlas (305 m), Landkreis Burgenlandkreis, Finne
 Großer Fallstein (288 m), Harz district, Fallstein
 Butterberg (Ilsenburg) (279 m), Harz district
 Petersberg (251 m), Saale district
 Domburg (241 m), Harz district, Hakel
 Bullenberg (210.6 m), Börde district, Lappwald 
 Edelberg (209 m), Börde district, Hohes Holz
 Kniel (205 m), Börde district, southeastern extension of the Lappwald Ridge
 Hohe Gieck (193 m), Wittenberg district, Düben Heath Nature Park 
 Michelsberg (185 m), Wittenberg district, Fläming
 Hirseberg (184 m), Wittenberg district, Fläming
 Langer Berg (160 m), Altmarkkreis Salzwedel, Zichtau Forest and  Hellberge 
 Großer Wartberg (146 m), Börde district, Börde
 Butterberg (141 m), Börde district, Flechtingen Hills 
 Wartenberg (121 m), Salzland district, Börde
 Ochsenberg (109 m), Salzland district
 Kappaun-Berg (105,4 m), Landkreis Jerichower Land
 Dolchauer Berg, Salzwedel district, Kalbescher Werder

See also 
 List of the highest mountains in Germany
 List of the highest mountains in the German states
 List of mountain and hill ranges in Germany

!
Saxony-Anhalt
Mount